Ruth Marie Terry (September 8, 1936 – c. July 1974), also known as Lady of the Dunes, was a formerly unidentified murder victim found on July 26, 1974, in the Race Point Dunes in Provincetown, Massachusetts. Her body was exhumed in 1980, 2000, and 2013 in efforts to identify her killer. On October 31, 2022, the FBI field office in Boston announced that the victim had been identified as Ruth Marie Terry.

Background 
Ruth Marie Terry was born on September 8, 1936, in a mountainside shack in Whitwell, Tennessee to Eva Terry, who died at the age of 23, and Johnny Terry. In 1956, Terry married Billy Ray Smith, but the marriage was short-lived and they quickly divorced. She left Whitwell the following year to work at the Fisher Body automotive plant in Livonia, Michigan. In 1958, she gave birth to her son, Richard, but Terry was unable to care for him due to financial difficulties. She allowed the superintendent of her workplace, Richard Hanchett Sr., to adopt her son in return for him paying off her expenses. After the adoption process was finalized, Terry left Livonia and moved to California.

In 1972, Terry reached out to her son, but he was not ready to meet her due to a drug overdose which left him in a coma for 18 days. On February 16, 1974, Terry married antiques dealer Guy Rockwell Muldavin in Reno, Nevada. Four months before her death, they visited her family in her hometown. Ruth's grand-niece, Brittanie Novoglonsky, said her family noticed that Terry "wasn't herself" whenever she was with Muldavin. She also said that Muldavin acted as if he owned Terry and made her inaccessible to her family. The couple then visited Terry's half-brother, Kenneth and his wife, Carole, in Chattanooga, Tennessee. Kenneth and Carole Terry later recalled the two saying they were going to travel the United States to look for antiques. Kenneth Terry noted that they also spoke about returning to Massachusetts as they were leaving.

In the late summer of 1974, Muldavin returned to Tennessee to tell Terry's family that she had gone missing from the couple's California home. According to Terry's sister-in-law, Jan Terry, Muldavin stayed for a short time and simply told them that he didn't know where Terry was. Terry's brother, James, traveled to California where he hired a private investigator to find her. The investigator told Terry's family that all of her belongings had been sold and that she had left the state of her own will. He also said that she had become involved with a religious cult. In the two decades prior to her identification Terry was listed as deceased in family obituaries. Carole Terry, her sister-in-law, theorized that she was in a witness protection program and could not contact her family.

Discovery

On July 26, 1974, a 12-year-old girl was chasing a barking dog, which had found the decomposing body of an unidentified woman in the Race Point Dunes of Provincetown, Massachusetts. The dog had wandered off, and the girl followed and spotted what she thought was a dead deer but soon realized it to be a human body. The remains were just yards away from a road and had a significant amount of insect activity. Two sets of footprints led to the body, and tire tracks were found  from the scene. The woman may have died two weeks beforehand.

The victim was lying face-down on half of a beach blanket. There was no sign of a struggle; police theorized she either knew her killer or had been asleep when she died. A blue bandanna and pair of Wrangler jeans were under her head. She had long auburn or red hair pulled back into a ponytail by a gold-flecked elastic band. Her toenails were painted pink.

She also had dental work – including crowns – worth $5,000-$10,000, which dentists called the "New York style" of dental work. Several of her teeth had been removed. Both hands and one forearm were missing. Most sources say she was between 25 and 40 years old. However, she could have been as young as 20 or as old as 49.

The woman was nearly decapitated, possibly from strangulation; one side of her head had been crushed possibly with a military-type entrenching tool. This head injury was the cause of death. There were also signs of sexual assault, likely postmortem.

Some investigators believe that the missing teeth, hands, and forearm indicate the killer wanted to hide either the victim's identity or their own.

The woman was buried in October 1974 after the case went cold. In 2014, one of the case investigators raised funds for a new casket, because the original thin metal casket had rusted and deteriorated.

Investigation

Police pored over thousands of missing-person cases and a list of approved vehicles driven through the area; no matches were found. At the scene, the sand and beach blanket were not disturbed, suggesting that the body was possibly moved to the specific spot where her body was found. No other evidence was found (besides the jeans, bandanna, blanket and ponytail holder) despite extensive searches of the surrounding dunes.

The first facial reconstruction of the woman was created with clay in 1979. Her remains were exhumed in 1980 for examination; no new clues were uncovered (although the skull was not buried at the time). The body was exhumed again in March 2000 for DNA testing. In May 2010, a CT of her skull was carried out that generated images that were then used by the National Center for Missing and Exploited Children for another reconstruction.

Leads

In 1987, a Canadian woman told a friend that she saw her father strangle a woman in Massachusetts around 1972. Police attempted to locate the woman but were unsuccessful. Another woman told police the reconstruction of the victim looked like her sister, who had disappeared in Boston in 1974.

Investigators also followed a lead involving missing criminal Rory Gene Kesinger, who would have been 25 years old at the time of the murder (she had broken out of jail in 1973). Authorities saw a resemblance between Kesinger and the victim. However, DNA from Kesinger's mother did not match the victim.

Two other missing women, Francis Ewalt of Montana and Vicke Lamberton of Massachusetts, were also ruled out.

Jaws film extra possibility

Joe Hill, the son of horror author Stephen King, brought this to police attention after reading The Skeleton Crew: How Amateur Sleuths are Solving America's Coldest Cases just weeks before. While watching the film's Fourth of July beach scene, Hill spotted a woman in the crowd wearing a blue bandana and jeans, similar to those found with the body. Although a lead investigator has noted interest in this lead, others have described it as "far-fetched" and "wild speculation".

Identification

In 2022, the skeletal remains were sent to Othram; from these, a DNA profile was generated that was used to identify distant relatives, and eventually identify the victim.

On October 31, 2022 the FBI field office in Boston announced that the victim had been identified as Ruth Marie Terry. No details of any potential suspects were disclosed nor any reason why Terry was in Massachusetts at the time of her murder. The FBI stated that Terry's identity was determined using investigative genealogy, the same method used to identify other unidentified homicides and over 150 criminals, including the Golden State Killer. The case is currently (as of October 2022) being investigated as a homicide by the Massachusetts State Police.

Guy Muldavin
On November 2, 2022, the Massachusetts State Police announced that they were seeking information on Terry's deceased husband, Guy Rockwell Muldavin (October 27, 1923 – March 14, 2002). Muldavin had also been known as Raoul Guy Muldaven, Raoul Guy Rockwell and Guy Muldavin Rockwell during his lifetime. Muldavin was an orphan who was adopted by Abram Albert Zadworanski Muldavin and Sylvia 'Lily' Silverblatt, and had a brother Michael Semyon J. Muldavin. In 1942, Muldavin was living in Manhattan, New York and attended the American Academy of Dramatic Arts. He was disqualified from active service in the military during the Second World War due to a mastoid infection. On May 11, 1946, while working as a professor, he married Joellen Mae Loop in Bellevue, Pennsylvania. The couple lived in New York, California, and then Seattle, Washington where he worked as a disk jockey. The couple divorced on July 16, 1956. Two years later, Raoul Guy Rockwell married Manzanita Aileen 'Manzy' Ryan on September 30, 1958, in Kootenai, Idaho. Manzanita had a daughter from a previous marriage, Dolores Ann Mearns, who was 18 at the time. She and her mother disappeared in Seattle, Washington on April Fool's Day in 1960 and Muldavin was the prime suspect. He fled Seattle but was arrested by the FBI and charged with unlawful flight to avoid giving testimony into their deaths. Shortly thereafter, Muldavin married Evelyn Marie Emerson on July 29, 1960, in King County, Washington, and they married again a second time on August 10, 1963, in Los Angeles. Muldavin subsequently faced larceny charges for swindling his third wife's family out of $10,000 around the time his second wife went missing. In 1961 he was convicted of those charges and was sentenced to no more than 15 years. In March 1962, a judge suspended the sentence provided that Muldavin repay the money.  

True-crime writer Ann Rule devoted a section of her 2007 book Smoke, Mirrors and Murder to Muldavin in connection with the 1960 disappearance of his second wife and her daughter, with an extensive discussion of police efforts to connect Muldavin with the crime. Investigators found dismembered human body parts in Muldavin's septic tank but were unable to prove they were from either of the missing women. According to Rule, Muldavin was never charged in connection with the disappearances, as the Kings County elected prosecutor was reluctant to charge Muldavin with murder without a confirmed body of a victim. Rule mentions that Muldavin married a woman named 'Teri' in February 1974 in Reno, Nevada.

Muldavin is also the prime suspect in the June 1950 murder of 28-year-old bread truck driver Henry Lawrence "Red" Baird and the disappearance of his 17-year-old waitress girlfriend Barbara Joe Kelley that occurred shortly thereafter. Barbara was last seen in Humboldt County, California on June 17, 1950. She lived in Fortuna, California and her boyfriend, Baird, lived in Eureka, California. They went out together that night, and they never returned. Baird's body was discovered face down on the beach near Table Bluff the following morning. He had received a headshot to the back. Except for his shoes and socks, he was naked. Barbara's personal clothing was found carefully folded and tucked underneath the rest of his, with the exception of her shoes and stockings. No trace of Barbara herself could be found. She has not been seen or heard from since, and it is thought that whoever shot Baird kidnapped her. One of Fortuna's two restaurants was owned by the parents of Muldavin's first wife, with whom he was then cohabitating. Barbara Kelley had a job at the other eatery. Both were on Baird's route. Muldavin also worked as a short-order cook in the restaurant owned by his father-in-law.

Earlier suspects

In 1981, investigators learned a woman who resembled the victim was seen with mobster Whitey Bulger around the time the woman presumably died. Bulger was known for removing his victims' teeth. A link to Bulger has not been proven, and he was murdered in prison in 2018.

Tony Costa, a serial killer in the area, was initially a suspect, but later eliminated. Costa died on May 12, 1974. The victim was found in July 1974.

Hadden Clark confession
Murderer Hadden Clark confessed to the murder, stating "I could have told the police what her name was, but after they beat the shit out of me, I wasn't going to tell them shit.[...] This murder is still unsolved and what the police are looking for is in my grandfather's garden." Authorities say Clark suffers from paranoid schizophrenia, a condition which may lead someone to confess falsely to crimes.

In 2004, Clark sent a letter to a friend stating that he had killed a woman on Cape Cod, Massachusetts. He also sent two drawings: one of a handless, naked woman sprawled on her stomach, and another of a map pointing to where the body was found.

In April 2000, Clark led police to a spot where he claimed he had buried two victims 20 years before. He also stated that he had murdered several others in various states between the 1970s and the 1990s.

See also
Spokane Millie Doe
Miss X (decedent)
Perry County Jane Doe

References

Cited works and further reading

External links
Fox News report

1936 births
1974 deaths
1974 murders in the United States
July 1974 events in the United States
20th-century American women
People from Tennessee
Deaths by beating in the United States
Deaths by person in Massachusetts
False confessions
Female murder victims
Incidents of violence against women
People from Provincetown, Massachusetts
Provincetown, Massachusetts
Sexual assaults in the United States
Unsolved murders in the United States
Violence against women in the United States
Women in Massachusetts